Base Ball Bear is a Japanese rock band from Tokyo that made its major debut in 2006 with EMI Music Japan. Although assembled in autumn 2001, the band formally began in 2002, and started off with self-produced releases.

Their style influences include Japanese indie rock bands Number Girl and Supercar, and British rock bands such as Oasis. They have been noted for the "nostalgic" feel of band leader Yūsuke Koide's lyrics, often about teenage life and memories. Base Ball Bear are also known for their contributions to the soundtrack of the movie Linda Linda Linda (in which bassist Shiori Sekine had a leading role) and performing the themes to the anime series Toshokan Sensō, Ōkiku Furikabutte and Gintama.

The band, initially named Planet, was formed for a one-time performance at a high school culture festival, but decided to continue due to how well-received they were and the fun they had at the festival. The name Planet had likely come from the Supercar song of the same name, and the band's current name also derives partially from a song name. Koide had thought of Japanese singer Chocolat's song "Base Ball and Elvis Presley" and suggested the name "Base Ball". Guitarist Shohei Yuasa thought it would be better if one more word was added to it, and the rest of the band agreed, eventually settling on the word "bear".

In 2016, the band announced the departure of Shohei Yuasa and that they would continue with 3 members.

Members

Current members
 
 Born December 9, 1984 in Edogawa, Tokyo
 Vocalist and guitarist
 Primary lyricist and composer of the band's music 
 Likes old school hip hop and favorite artists include XTC, Happy End, Berryz Koubou and Perfume
 
 Born December 8, 1985 in Saitama Prefecture (youngest member)
 Bassist and backing vocalist
 The only female member and had no experience playing bass before joining
 Favorite artists include Jethro Tull, Caravan, Keiichi Suzuki, Yui and GO!GO!7188
 Also bassist of Paranmaum band from the 2005 movie Linda Linda Linda
 
 Born January 17, 1985 in Tokyo
 Drummer and chorus
 Favorite artists include The Police, the Red Hot Chili Peppers, John Frusciante, and Nile Rodgers

Past members
 
 Born April 16, 1984 in Chiba Prefecture
 Guitarist
 Favorite artists include Thee Michelle Gun Elephant and Sly & the Family Stone

History

Formation and early years
Koide originally assembled the band in 2001 under the name "Planet," to perform at their high school's fall festival. They performed covers of the songs OOYeah!! and OOKeah!! by the band Supercar. Following their festival performance, they decided to continue with the band as a hobby.

In March 2002, the band formally assembled. In April they began sending demo tapes to record labels, whereupon they were advised by Toshiba EMI to change their name. They eventually chose "Base Ball Bear," the name under which they performed their first gig at Shimokitazawa Garage that July. Throughout the rest of the year, they continued playing in the Shibuya and Shimokitazawa areas of Tokyo as their fan base began to grow.

In November 2003, Base Ball Bear signed with Blitz Pia Records, an independent label. They immediately released their first mini-album Yūgata Generation on November 26. The band released its first single, Yume is Vision, in April of the following year. It was the first of the band's songs to be accompanied by a music video, which was created in collaboration with Yūki, a Japanese fashion magazine model and Base Ball Bear fan. The band spent the rest of 2004 practicing and writing new songs, some of where were featured on compilation CDs.

The band released its first full-length album, High Color Times, on March 16, 2005, and started playing concerts to sold-out crowds in larger venues. Also, Shiori Sekine was cast in one of the lead roles in the film Linda Linda Linda, which featured some of the band's music.

Major debut and increasing popularity
Base Ball Bear signed with EMI Music Japan in January 2006, and immediately released an introductory album, Band B ni Tsuite, on January 12. Although they had previously released another version of Band B ni Tsuite on October 14, 2005, this new release included one new song and other remastering. They then played on the "Nyakunyaku Nannyo Summer Tour" with Chatmonchy and Snowkel and released their first major album, C, on October 29.
 
Their first solo tour "Live by the C" took place in the spring of 2007. Over the course of the year, they released four more singles, as well as their second major album, Jūnanasai. Their live performances included the Rock in Japan Festival, another round on the "Nyakunyaku Nannyo Summer Tour", and the "B-Pop High School Tour".

In 2008, the band went on a solo tour called "17-sai Kara Yattemasu Tour" that ran from the middle to the end of March. Their first single of the year, Changes, was released on May 8, 2008 and was the ending theme to the Production I.G anime series Toshokan Sensō. The band then made its first appearance on the popular music program Music Station on May 9 and performed Changes on the show. Base Ball Bear also performed a two-day show at Shibuya C.C. Lemon Hall in late September.

In January 2009, they released their eighth single Love Mathematics and a compilation album Kanzenban Band B ni Tsuite containing all their indies songs. Following the releases, the band went on a tour called "Live Mathematics Tour 2009" starting in March. They also held a show named "Hibiya Nonfiction" at Hibiya Open-Air Concert Hall on June 27. With a total of four singles in 2009, the band closed out the year by releasing their third album (What Is The) Love & Pop? in September and achieving ninth place on the Oricon Weekly Albums Chart. It was their first album to reach the top ten, and they held a five-venue tour at Zepp halls to promote the album.

Base Ball Bear managed their first solo concert at the Nippon Budokan on January 3, 2010, titled "Live;(This Is The) Base Ball Bear".

Departure of Shohei Yuasa

In 2016, also the band's 10th anniversary of debut and their 15th year together, it was announced that guitarist Shohei Yuasa would be leaving the band. According to their management agency, since mid-February that year, Yuasa had been uncontactable and did not turn up at the studio when they were scheduled for production work. He then declared his intention through a third party that he was unable to continue his activities in Base Ball Bear. After that, the staff and members tried to contact Yuasa directly for several days but no one managed to reach him.

On February 27, Base Ball Bear went through with a scheduled appearance at a festival with the remaining 3 members, announcing that Yuasa could not participate as he was not well. However, with the band's own tour "Live By The C2" due to kick off on March 5, the agency had no choice but to make the decision public on March 2 that it would be difficult for them to continue as four. The tour would instead have ex-Doping Panda member Yutaka Furukawa perform as a support guitarist.

To this, the band's members and staff felt unable to comprehend the situation and expressed regret. Vocalist Koide said that they had spent more than half their lives together and it was "very regretful" that Yuasa would leave the band. Horinouchi said it was "vexing" because he had believed the band would be 4 members "for 20 or even 30 years." Having taken for granted that they would always be four, he could not understand why this had happened and "even feels anger." Bassist Sekine said that she was "extremely bewildered at first by this sudden development", and that she had never thought about anyone leaving. She expressed that she was uneasy that something precious to her had "crumbled", but no matter what she wanted to continue Base Ball Bear, and Koide and Horinouchi felt the same.

Discography

Self-produced works

Indies

Singles

Albums

Various artist compilations

Major label

Singles

Digital download releases

Albums

Mini-albums

Live albums

Best-of albums

Various artist compilations

Video releases

Live DVDs

Music video compilations

Other releases
Band B ni Tsuite (バンドBについて About Band B) (2006-01-12)
Special introducing album limited to 5000 copies.
This is the same as the indies release except for track eight "Girl of Arms", which was replaced by "Labyrinth e no Timing" as track two for this release.
Yoakemae no Yoakemae (2011-04-07)
Limited edition single only sold at live venues on the band's "Base Ball Bear 10th Anniversary 'Sayonara-Nostalgia Tour'".
Contains live performance audio recordings of two songs, "Yoakemae" and "Changes".

Other collaborative works

Yusuke Koide only
Shiho Nanba  (2011-06-15)
Lyricist
Shiho Nanba  (2012-03-07)
Lyricist
Becky "15 ~Spring Flag~" (2012-06-27)
Co-lyricist and composer
Okamoto's  (2012-07-18)
Co-lyricist with Okamoto's
Chocolat (2012-12-05)
Lyricist and composer
Mai Endo "Today is the Day"(2013-07-31) 
Co-lyricist with copywriter Hikaru Arashida, composer
Tokyo Girls' Style "Partition Love" (2013-09-25)
Lyricist and composer
Yasuyuki Okamura w Yusuke Koide  (2014-04-02)
Vocalist and lyricist

As Base Ball Bear
iLL  (2010-06-23)
Co-lyricist and co-composer with Koji Nakamura, vocals
Hyadain  (2013-01-13)
Arrangement and guest vocals

Media appearances

Film
 Linda Linda Linda (2005) - Sekine as Nozomi Shirakawa
 Library War: The Wings of Revolution (2012) - Koide as Rikudō Mark Ingram (voice acting)

Television
 Base Ball Bear no Base Ball Variety (Space Shower TV)
 Base Ball Bear no Base Ball Variety 2 (Space Shower TV)
 Base Ball Bear no Base Ball Variety 3 (Space Shower TV)
 Base Ball Bear no Base Ball Variety 4 (Space Shower TV)

Radio
 Base Ball Bear no All Night Nippon R (JOLF, December 2, 2006, March 3, 2007)
 Base Ball Bear no Soft Ball Dōkō-kai (JFN, 2009)
 School of Lock "Bebobe Locks!" (TFM, 2009–present)

See also

Chatmonchy
Snowkel
Sakanaction
Okamoto's
Yurina Kumai
Tsubasa Honda

References

External links

Base Ball Bear Official Website 
Base Ball Bear @ Nippop

Japanese alternative rock groups
Musical groups established in 2002
2002 establishments in Japan
Musical groups from Tokyo
Universal Music Japan artists